Geoffrey Stephen Pedley (known as Stephen; born 13 September 1940) was the Bishop suffragan of Lancaster from 1998 until 2005.

He was educated at Marlborough and Queens' College, Cambridge. Ordained in 1966 after a period of study at Ripon College Cuddesdon he began his career with curacies in Liverpool and Coventry before a spell in Zambia. Returning to England in 1977 he became Vicar of St Peter's, Stockton-on-Tees and then Whickham before becoming a Residentiary Canon at Durham Cathedral, a post he held until his elevation to the Episcopate.

References

1940 births
People educated at Marlborough College
Alumni of Queens' College, Cambridge
Alumni of Ripon College Cuddesdon
Anglican bishops of Lancaster
Honorary Chaplains to the Queen
Living people